A constitutional referendum was held in Morocco on 13 September 1996. The new constitution created a bicameral Parliament by adding the Assembly of Councillors to the existing Assembly of Representatives. The 270-seat Assembly of Councillors would be indirectly elected by local councillors (162 seats), chambers of commerce (81), and trade unions (27), whilst the 325-seat Assembly of Representatives would now be entirely directly elected. The changes were approved by 99.5% of voters, with an 85% turnout. Fresh elections were held the following year.

Results

References

1996 referendums
Referendums in Morocco
1996 in Morocco
Constitutional referendums in Morocco